Selina Bliss is an American politician, nurse and a Republican member of the Arizona House of Representatives elected to represent District 1 in 2022.

Education
Bliss graduated from Arizona State University with a Masters in Nursing, and a Doctorate in Nursing from Capella University.

Elections
2022 Bliss and Quang Nguyen won a four-way contest in the Republican Primary, defeating incumbent State Representative Judy Burges. They went on to defeat Democrats Cathy Ransom and Neil Sinclair in the general election.

References

External links
 Biography at Ballotpedia

Republican Party members of the Arizona House of Representatives
Living people
Year of birth missing (living people)
21st-century American politicians
People from Prescott, Arizona
21st-century American women politicians
Arizona State University alumni
Capella University alumni